Four Jacks may refer to:

 Four Jacks (film), a 2001 Australian action film
 Four Jacks (quartet), a Danish vocal quartet, founded in 1956